Ragoza is a surname. Notable people with the surname include:

 Alexander Ragoza (1858–1919), Russian general and Ukrainian politician
 Yevgeni Ragoza (born 1979), Russian footballer and coach